Ceratomyxa yokoyamai is a myxosporean parasite that infects gall-bladders of serranid fishes from the Great Barrier Reef. It was first found on Epinephelus maculatus.

References

Further reading
Kalatzis, Panos G., Constantina Kokkari, and Pantelis Katharios. "Description and relationships of two novel species of Ceratomyxa Thelohan, 1892 infecting the gallbladders of Aulopiformes: Atlantic lizardfish Synodus saurus Linnaeus, 1758 and royal flagfin Aulopus filamentosus Bloch, 1792 from Cretan Sea, Greece." Parasitology research 112.5 (2013): 2055–2061.

External links

Animal parasites of fish
Veterinary parasitology
Animals described in 2009
Ceratomyxidae